The 1967 Atlanta 500 was a NASCAR Grand National Series event that was held on April 2, 1967, at Atlanta International Raceway in Hampton, Georgia.

The transition to purpose-built racecars began in the early 1960s and occurred gradually over that decade.  Changes made to the sport by the late 1960s brought an end to the "strictly stock" vehicles of the 1950s.

Background
Atlanta International Raceway (now Atlanta Motor Speedway) is one of ten current intermediate tracks to hold NASCAR races; the others are Charlotte Motor Speedway, Chicagoland Speedway, Darlington Raceway, Homestead Miami Speedway, Kansas Speedway, Kentucky Speedway, Las Vegas Motor Speedway, New Hampshire Motor Speedway, and Texas Motor Speedway. However, at the time, only Charlotte and Darlington were built.

The track's turns are banked at twenty-four degrees, while the front stretch, the location of the finish line, and the back stretch are banked at five.

Race report
There were 44 American-born drivers on the grid; Cale Yarborough defeated Dick Hutcherson by more than one lap in front of 70,000 audience members. Yarborough would score his second career win, along with his first win of 1967, and end a 31-race drought. The race lasted nearly four hours with the average speed being . Veteran NASCAR owner Nord Krauskopf would employ drivers Charlie Glotzbach and Bobby Isaac during the race. Blackie Watt would finish in last-place on lap 2 due to engine failure. Meanwhile, windshield problems would knock Don White out of the race at lap 193 of 334. Six cautions slowed the field for 39 laps.

Fred Lorenzen would race for the final time in his legendary #28 white and blue 1967 Ford Fairlane machine that would make him popular in NASCAR. Curtis Turner, who was driving a Chevrolet owned by Smokey Yunick, would escape being injured in a practice crash.

The purse for this race was $64,995 ($ when adjusted for inflation); the winner's share was $21,035 ($ when adjusted for inflation) while last place received $540 ($ when adjusted for inflation).

Qualifying

Failed to qualify: Ben Lane (#78)

Finishing order
Section reference: 

 Cale Yarborough
 Dick Hutcherson
 Buddy Baker
 Charlie Glotzbach
 Bobby Isaac
 James Hylton
 Friday Hassler
 John Sears
 Donnie Allison
 G.C. Spencer
 J.T. Putney
 Donnie Allison
 Sonny Hutchins
 Buddy Arrington
 Jim Paschal
 Bill Champion
 Paul Lewis
 Sam McQuagg
 Mario Andretti
 Tiny Lund
 David Pearson
 Richard Petty
 Darel Dieringer
 Don White
 Wayne Smith
 Elmo Langley
 A. J. Foyt
 Fred Lorenzen
 Roy Mayne
 LeeRoy Yarbrough
 Paul Goldsmith
 Bay Darnell
 Jack Harden
 Neil Castles
 Bobby Johns
 Frank Warren
 Eldon Yarborough
 John Martin
 Clyde Lynn
 Wendell Scott
 Gordon Johncock
 Dick Johnson
 Bill Seifert
 Blackie Watt

Timeline
Section reference: 
 Start of race: Cale Yarborough was leading the pack when the green flag was waved.
 Lap 2: Blackie Watt had some engine issues which forced him out of the race.
 Lap 4: Bill Seifert had some engine issues which forced him out of the race.
 Lap 5: Dick Johnson had some engine issues which forced him out of the race.
 Lap 9: Gordon Johncock had a terminal crash.
 Lap 10: Wendell Scott had some engine issues which forced him out of the race.
 Lap 13: Clyde Lynn had some engine issues which forced him out of the race.
 Lap 44: An oil leak in his vehicle took John Martin out of the race.
 Lap 46: Eldon Yarbrough managed to overheat his vehicle.
 Lap 54: Frank Warren just could not handle the vehicle's faulty transmission and left the race.
 Lap 61: Darel Dieringer took over the lead from Cale Yarborough.
 Lap 68: Fred Lorenzen took over the lead from Darel Dieringer.
 Lap 70: Cale Yarborough took over the lead from Fred Lorenzen.
 Lap 80: Bobby Johns had some engine issues which forced him out of the race.
 Lap 100: Fred Lorenzen took over the lead from Cale Yarborough.
 Lap 101: Cale Yarborough took over the lead from Fred Lorenzen.
 Lap 114: Neil Castles' vehicle developed some issues with its suspension.
 Lap 120: Jack Harden had a terminal crash.
 Lap 123: The differential on Bay Darnell's care developed some serious issues.
 Lap 152: Mario Andretti took over the lead from Cale Yarborough.
 Lap 153: Paul Goldsmith managed to overheat his vehicle.
 Lap 158: Cale Yarborough took over the lead from Mario Andretti.
 Lap 162: LeeRoy Yarbrough had some engine issues which forced him out of the race.
 Lap 173: Fred Lorenzen had a terminal crash.
 Lap 174: A.J. Foyt had some engine issues which forced him out of the race.
 Lap 175: Elmo Langley had some engine issues which forced him out of the race.
 Lap 180: Buddy Baker took over the lead from Cale Yarborough.
 Lap 184: Wayne Smith had some engine issues which forced him out of the race.
 Lap 193: Don White's vehicle suffered from a troublesome windshield.
 Lap 195: Darel Dieringer had some engine issues which forced him out of the race.
 Lap 197: Cale Yarborough took over the lead from Buddy Baker.
 Lap 215: Richard Petty had some engine issues which forced him out of the race.
 Lap 224: A faulty ignition ended David Pearson's hopes of winning the race.
 Lap 246: Tiny Lund had some engine issues which forced him out of the race.
 Lap 261: Mario Andretti had a terminal crash.
 Lap 277: Sam McQuagg's vehicle developed some problems with its suspension.
 Finish: Cale Yarborough was officially declared the winner of the event.

References

Atlanta 500
Atlanta 500
NASCAR races at Atlanta Motor Speedway